Bunu or Ribina (Rebina, Rubunu) is an East Kainji language of Toro LGA, Bauchi State, Nigeria belonging to the Shammo cluster.

Villages
It is spoken in the villages of:

Rinjin Gani
Ribina
Pingana

Demographics
Speaker estimates include:
2,000 speakers in 1971
4,000 speakers in 2004

References

East Kainji languages
Languages of Nigeria